Alice Haining (born October 8, 1957) is an American actress.

Early years
Born in Jackson, Mississippi, Haining is the daughter of Dr. Joe L. Haining and Jean Haining. Her father was a research chemist, and her mother was a teacher. Haining was valedictorian of her class at Woodland Hills Academy and at Mississippi College. She graduated from the latter in 1981 with majors in English and modern languages.

Career
Before she became active on stage in New York City, Haining produced Figure Out, a children's program, for Mississippi Educational Television.

Haining's career was largely in daytime soaps, beginning in 1982 when she played Jodie Fields on Search for Tomorrow. She then went on to play the role of Liza Colby on All My Children in 1984, replacing Marcy Walker who had left the show. She also portrayed the role of Cecilia Thompson Sowolosky on Loving from 1985 to 1986. Haining is perhaps best known for playing Angel Lange Snyder on the CBS soap opera As the World Turns, where she was on from 1988 to 1994.

Haining portrayed Marcia Giles in a 1991 Circle in the Square Theatre production of the play On Borrowed Time, written by Paul Osborn. On film, she acted in A Shock to the System (1990) and Top of the World (1994). Her off-Broadway credits include playing Helen in Emerald City (1988), Beth in Swim Visit (1990), Armande in The Learned Ladies (1991), and Tood in The Cover of Life (1994).

Filmography

References

External links
 

1957 births
American television actresses
American soap opera actresses
Living people
Actors from Jackson, Mississippi
Actresses from Mississippi
21st-century American women
Broadway theatre people
20th-century American actresses